Atacames Canton is a canton of Ecuador, located in the Esmeraldas Province.  Its capital is the town of Atacames.  Its population at the 2001 census was 30,267.

Demographics
Ethnic groups as of the Ecuadorian census of 2010:
Mestizo  55.0%
Afro-Ecuadorian  34.2%
White  7.9%
Montubio  2.1%
Indigenous  0.4%
Other  0.4%

References

 www.inec.gov.ec (Spanish)

Cantons of Esmeraldas Province